Dombrov is a Hasidic dynasty founded by Rebbe Mordechai Dovid Unger (c. 1770-1846). Dombrov is the Yiddish name of Dąbrowa Tarnowska, a town in present-day Poland.

Lineage
Unger was the son of Tsvi Hersh, a disciple of Elimelech of Lizhensk and Avrohom Yehosua Heshel of Apt. He studied under the Kozhnitzer Magid.

Rebbes of the Unger Family
 Mordechai Dovid Unger of Dombrov
 Yosef of Dombrov—son of Morechai Dovid
 Yisroel Elimelech Unger of Zhabno—son of Yosef
 Mordechai David Unger of Tsanz—son of Yisroel Elimelech 
 Ben Zion Unger of Tsanz—son of Mordechai Davi, son-in-law of Rabbi Sholom Reinman of the Narol hasidic dynasty
 Yaakov Yitzchak Unger, Dombrover rebbe in America—son of Ben Zion
 Ben Zion Unger, present Dombrover Rebbe of Boro Park
 Mordechai David Unger of Bobov-45

Another section of the family
 Menachem Mendel Unger of Dombrov-Stobnitz son of Mordechai Dovid of Dombrov
 Yisro§el of Dombrov-Stobnitz son of Menachem Mendel
 Meir Mordechai Dovid of Dombrov-Stobnitz son of Yisroel
 Yerachmiel of Dombrov-Stobnitz son of Meir Mordechai and son-in-law of Chaim Yaakov, Safrin rebb of Komarno
 Yisroel Unger of Dombrov-Stobnitz son of Yerachmiel (in Boro Park)

Rebbes of the Rubin Family

 Meir Rubin of Glogov-Dombrova, son-in-law of Yosef of Dombrova
  Chaim Yechiel Rubin of Dombrova, son of Meir
 Yissachar Berish Rubin of Dombrova. Rebbe in Berlin, and later in Washington Heights, New York.
 Esriel Rubin of Dombrova, son in law of Yisachar Ber Shapiro of the Nadvorna dynasty
 Naftoli Tzvi Rubin of Dombrova-Monsey, son of Esriel

The Satmar rebbe is a descendant of the Dombrov dynasty.

Ostrov-Kalushin
Grand Rabbi of Kaloshin R' Avraham Elchanan Unger - son of Rabbi Mordechai Dovid of Dombrov and son-in-law of Rabbi Klonimus Kalman Szternfeld (Horowitz) of Paritzk.
Grand  Rabbi Yaakov Yitzhak Unger of Kalushin - son of R' Avraham Elchanan
Grand Rabbi of Ostrov-Kalushin Rabbi Naftali Aryeh Spiegel - son-in-law of R' Yaakov Yitzchok 
Grand Rabbi Pinchas Eliyahu Spiegel of Ostrov-Kalushin - son of Naftali Aryeh
Grand Rabbi Moshe Spiegel of Ostrov-Kalushin (Long Beach) - son of Pinchas Eliyahu
Grand Rabbi Yaakov Yitzchok Spiegel of Ostrov-Kalushin (Boro Park) - son of Pinchas Eliyahu
Grand Rabbi Dovid Spiegel of Ostrov-Kalushin (Cedarhurst) - son of Pinchas Eliyahu
Grand Rabbi Elchonon Yochanon Spiegel of Ostrov-Kalushin - son of Naftali Aryeh
Grand Rabbi Moshe Menachem Spiegel of Ostrov-Kalushin  - son of Naftali Aryeh

References

Hasidic dynasties